Bengt Heyman (August 26, 1883 – June 3, 1942) was a Swedish sailor who competed in the 1912 Summer Olympics. He was a crew member of the Swedish boat Sans Atout, which won the silver medal in the 8 metre class.

References

External links
profile

1883 births
1942 deaths
Swedish male sailors (sport)
Sailors at the 1912 Summer Olympics – 8 Metre
Olympic sailors of Sweden
Olympic silver medalists for Sweden
Olympic medalists in sailing
Medalists at the 1912 Summer Olympics
20th-century Swedish people